Ernst Gebauer (23 May 1782 – 7 July 1865) was a German painter. His works from the War of Liberation against Napoleon's rule are particularly well known.

Gallery

References

1782 births
1865 deaths
19th-century German painters
19th-century German male artists
German male painters
German portrait painters
Court painters